The 'Sims House at 513 N. State St. in Jackson, Mississippi is significant as one of the last surviving Queen Anne style houses on the state capitol's "Grand Boulevard".  Following construction of the state's Beaux-Arts style capitol building (designed by Theodore Link) in 1903, North State Street developed as a tree-lined avenue of homes of state leaders.  Notable Mississippi native Dr. Walter Scott Sims, who was the state's first eye, ear, nose and throat specialist and who was a pioneer in eye cataract surgery, bought the property from Joseph Henry Morris in 1905.  The house was built in c. 1905 for Sims.

The house was listed on the National Register of Historic Places in 1983.  When listed, it was under restoration and was owned by descendants of Joseph Henry Morris.

Other notable homes on the street listed on, or eligible for, the National Register have included:
Merrill-Maley House (c.1907), 739 N. State St., Colonial Revival, (designed by Theodore Link?)
Will Watkins House (c.1908), 1423 N. State St., Colonial Revival, (designed by Theodore Link?)
Smith-Crowder-Capers House (c.1894), Queen Anne
Millsaps-Buie House (c.1888), 628 N. State St., Queen Anne, but remodeled c.1928 with a monumental Greek Revival portico.

Notes

References

Queen Anne architecture in Mississippi
Colonial Revival architecture in Mississippi
Houses completed in 1905
Houses on the National Register of Historic Places in Mississippi
Houses in Jackson, Mississippi
National Register of Historic Places in Jackson, Mississippi
1905 establishments in Mississippi